Becky Minger (born 1987) is an American beauty pageant titleholder who was crowned Miss Ohio 2010 and competed in the Miss America 2011 Pageant on January 15, 2011, in Las Vegas, Nevada. She is a graduate of Bowling Green State University, where she majored in Interpersonal Communications with a minor in political science.

References

External links
 
 
 Becky Minger Miss Ohio 2010 Official Website
 Miss Ohio Scholarship Foundation

Miss America 2011 delegates
Living people
Bowling Green State University alumni
American beauty pageant winners
1987 births
People from Sylvania, Ohio
Women in Ohio